Terry Albert Barr (August 8, 1935 – May 28, 2009) was an American football player.  He played professional football for nine seasons in the National Football League (NFL) for the Detroit Lions from 1957 to 1965.  He began his NFL career as a defensive back and return specialist and later became one of the best pass receivers in the NFL. He played in the Pro Bowl in both 1963 and 1964, led the NFL with 13 touchdown receptions in 1963, and was among the NFL leaders with 1,086 receiving yards in 1963 and 1,030 receiving yards in 1964.  Over his nine-year NFL career, Barr appeared in 102 games and caught 227 passes for 3,810 yards and 35 touchdowns.

Barr also played college football as a halfback for the University of Michigan from 1954 to 1956.  He was selected as the Most Valuable Player on the 1955 Michigan Wolverines football team and was inducted into the University of Michigan Athletic Hall of Honor in 1994.

Early years
Barr was born in 1935 in Grand Rapids, Michigan. He grew up on the east side of Grand Rapids in a family of eight children. He attended Central High School in Grand Rapids. He played football and basketball and ran track at Central High School and was the Michigan state champion in the 440-yard dash in both 1952 and 1953.

University of Michigan

Barr enrolled at the University of Michigan in 1953 and played at the halfback position for Bennie Oosterbaan's Michigan Wolverines football teams from 1954 to 1956.  Barr first gained acclaim after leading Michigan to a victory over Army early in the 1955 season; he rushed for a touchdown in the first quarter and then returned a punt 82 yards for a touchdown in the second quarter.  At the end of the season, Barr was selected as the Most Valuable Player on the 1955 Michigan Wolverines football team that compiled a 7-2 record and was ranked #12 and #13 in the final AP and UPI polls.

During his junior and senior years from 1955 to 1956, Barr contributed over 1,600 yards to the Wolverines, including 611 rushing yards, 466 punt and kickoff return yards, 306 passing yards, and 140 receiving yards. He was inducted into the University of Michigan Athletic Hall of Honor in 1994.

Professional football
Barr was selected by the Detroit Lions in the third round (36th overall pick) of the 1957 NFL Draft. In his rookie season, he played in the NFL Championship Game. In Detroit's 59–14 win over Cleveland, Barr intercepted a pass and returned it 19 yards for a score. Barr spent nine seasons with the Lions from 1957 to 1965.  In his first three seasons, he was used principally as a defensive back and return specialist. He returned 26 kickoffs for 655 yards and 50 punts for 262 yards from 1957 to 1960.

The Lions began using him increasingly on offense in 1960, but he missed a portion of the 1962 season with a knee injury that required surgery.

Barr became one of the best pass receivers in the NFL from 1963 to 1964.  In 1963, he led the NFL with 13 touchdown receptions and was invited to play in his first Pro Bowl.  He also ranked among the NFL's leaders in 1963 with 13 touchdowns (2nd), 66 receptions (3rd), 1,086 receiving yards (4th), 77.6 receiving yards per game (5th), 78 points scored (7th), and 1,095 yards from scrimmage (7th).  In 1964, Barr was again selected to play in the Pro Bowl and again ranked among the NFL leaders with 1,030 receiving yards (2nd), 73.6 receiving yards per game (3rd), 9 receiving touchdowns (4th), 18.1 yards per reception (5th), 57 receptions (7th), and 1,061 yards from scrimmage (7th).

Barr's career ended after the 1965 season due to a knee injury.  Over his nine-year NFL career, Barr appeared in 102 games and caught 227 passes for 3,810 yards and 35 touchdowns.

Later year and family
After retiring from football, Barr was involved in several businesses in suburban Detroit. He operated an insurance agency in partnership with Joe Schmidt and Nick Pietrosante for several years.  In 1971, he bought a Southfield, Michigan-based company that became Terry Barr Sales L.L.C., which provided sales, marketing, engineering and other services to the automotive industry.  He was also the chairman of Libralter Plastics, an automotive industry supplier.  His business interests also included a restaurant and manufacturing operation. Barr was a past president of the Bloomfield Hills Country Club.

Barr was married, and he and his wife, Shelley, had three sons. He was inducted into the University of Michigan Athletic Hall of Honor and the Michigan Sports Hall of Fame.

Barr died in 2009 at age 73 after a long battle with Alzheimer's disease.

References

1935 births
2009 deaths
Deaths from dementia in Michigan
Deaths from Alzheimer's disease
American football wide receivers
Michigan Wolverines football players
Detroit Lions players
Western Conference Pro Bowl players
Players of American football from Grand Rapids, Michigan